Šárka Vaňková (born 30 October 1987) is a Czech singer from Jirkov. She was a contestant on Česko hledá SuperStar (aka Pop Idol) in 2004. After finishing in second place with 621,235 votes, Vaňková released her first CD. In May 2006, she released her second album called Teď a Tady ("Now And Here") which is a mix of pop and funky music with elements of jazz or even swing. Vaňková lives in Jirkov and attends school in Most.

Discography
Albums
Cesko hledá SuperStar Top 10 (June 2004)
Věřím Náhodám (26 November 2004)
Teď a Tady (May 2006)

Singles
Lásku Dávej
Nechci Být Jenom Tvůj Sen
Věřím Náhodám

External links
Music samples from Šárka's first CD

1987 births
Living people
21st-century Czech women singers
Idols (franchise) participants